Marathahalli is an eastern suburb of Bangalore city in Karnataka state of India. The locality is named after the Marut fighter aircraft designed and developed by Hindustan Aeronautics Limited which has many of its divisions nearby.

Connectivity 
A six-lane railway overbridge near Marathahalli Junction connects Kundalahalli area and HAL Airport Road. Marathahalli has emerged as a major bus stop for long distance Buses from Bangalore. The international airport is located at a distance of 46 km from Marathahalli through the Outer Ring Road and Bangalore Hyderabad Highway. The nearest railway station from Marathahalli is located at Krishnarajapuram railway station which is at a distance of 7.7 km

References

Neighbourhoods in Bangalore